Franklin Jacobs (born December 31, 1957 ) is a former high jumper from the United States.

Biography
Jacobs was one of ten children of Jannie Jacobs, living in a shack in Mullins, South Carolina. His parents separated when he was young. The impoverished family moved to Paterson, New Jersey when he was three and lived with four cousins. His first love was basketball, and he played for Paterson East-side High. He only started high jumping in his senior year, after the end of the basketball season.  He cleared  that year.  His natural talent overcame his lack of technique: he called his style the "Jacobs Slop", as opposed to the Fosbury Flop; but later renamed it the "Slope", from the trajectory of his launch.

Jacobs barely graduated high school and got no athletic scholarship, but enrolled at Fairleigh Dickinson University in Teaneck, New Jersey with a federal grant. He cleared  in his freshman year. In March 1977 he tore cartilage in his right leg playing basketball, but competed for over a year without surgery. He established a rivalry with Dwight Stones over the next two years, with media emphasizing the contrast between Jacobs, a short inner-city African American, and Stones, a tall blond Californian. Stones antagonized Jacobs by criticizing his unorthodox jumping style. He waived his right to try for an even higher record, saying he "didn't feel nervous enough". Two months later, Vladimir Yashchenko broke the record in Milan. In July, at a highly publicized international between the U.S. and the Soviet Union, Jacobs lost to Yashchenko on countback. In August, Jacobs won the Tanqueray Award for outstanding amateur athlete; by then he had won 27 collegiate events.

Jacobs anticipated gaining lucrative endorsements from the 1980 Olympics, but the U.S. boycott of the Games precluded this. He was extremely disappointed and wanted to skip the U.S. "Olympic Trials"; he attended by request of his college, but failed his opening height. He gave up the high jump and did not return to college. A planned return to competition in 1982  did not happen. In 1991, he commented, "I was upset and my dreams were shattered. I probably could have come back in 1984, but I was a naive kid. It was like the floor fell in."

He subsequently had various jobs around Paterson, working for a construction company 1986–91. He married Naomi Livingston c.1990 and had a daughter Shannon in 1992. Around 1995, they moved to Gilbert, Arizona. In 1998 he was working for an electrical installation company.  That year, he attended a Millrose Games tribute to stars of memorable previous meets.

Championship results

See also
 Men's high jump indoor world record progression

References

External links
 

1957 births
Living people
American male high jumpers
World record setters in athletics (track and field)
Sportspeople from Paterson, New Jersey
Track and field athletes from New Jersey
Track and field athletes from South Carolina
Fairleigh Dickinson University alumni
People from Mullins, South Carolina
People from Gilbert, Arizona
African-American male track and field athletes
Athletes (track and field) at the 1979 Pan American Games
Pan American Games medalists in athletics (track and field)
Pan American Games gold medalists for the United States
Medalists at the 1979 Pan American Games
21st-century African-American people
20th-century African-American sportspeople